Mating Call is a studio album by jazz musician Tadd Dameron with saxophonist John Coltrane, issued in early 1957 on Prestige Records. It was recorded at the studio of Rudy Van Gelder in Hackensack, New Jersey.

Track listing
All compositions by Tadd Dameron.
 "Mating Call" – 5:57
 "Gnid" –  5:07
 "Soultrane" – 5:24
 "On a Misty Night" – 6:23
 "Romas" – 7:45
 "Super Jet" – 6:00

Personnel
 Tadd Dameron – piano
 John Coltrane – tenor saxophone
 John Simmons – bass  
 Philly Joe Jones – drums

References

1957 albums
Tadd Dameron albums
Prestige Records albums
Albums recorded at Van Gelder Studio